Yī is a Chinese surname. It is also rarely spelled as Yih in Wade–Giles. According to a 2013 study, it was found to be the 289th most common surname, shared by 206,000 people or 0.016% of the population, with the province with the most being Shandong.

Notable people (伊) 
 (伊秉绶) (1754-1815), Chinese calligrapher and political figure
Yi Yi (actress) (Chinese: 伊一; born 1989 in Yongzhou, Hunan) is a Chinese actress and host
Yi Hai (伊海, or Yi Fujiu (伊桴鳩), I Fukyū in Japanese) was a Chinese painter and merchant who frequented the Japanese trading port of Nagasaki
Yi Ji (伊籍, fl. 200s–221), courtesy name Jibo, was an official serving in the state of Shu Han during the Three Kingdoms period of China
Yi Ling (伊玲, formerly 钱今凡, born 1928) is the oldest living transgender woman in China

References

Chinese-language surnames
Individual Chinese surnames